The Record-Observer newspaper serves Centreville, Maryland and is published once a week on Thursdays, with a readership of approximately 5,000, and a 2014 print circulation of 2,876.

It was formed from the 1936 merger of The Centreville Observer and Queen Anne Record.

In the 1930s it was purchased by Leon Asa Andrus. In 1946, Andrus would go on to wage a successful multi-year editorial campaign to get the Chesapeake Bay Bridge built.

In 2014, American Consolidated Media sold The Record Observer to family-owned Adams Publishing Group.

References 

Newspapers published in Maryland